For the Thai temple in Tampa, see Wat Mongkolratanaram, Tampa

Wat Mongkolratanaram is a small Thai Buddhist temple located in Berkeley, California. A wat, it mainly attracts Thai American Buddhists, many of whom are students at the University of California, Berkeley, but it also draws in many local, non-Buddhists who come searching for the authentic Thai food public brunch on Sundays or attend its frequent cultural events. The temple is home to a Thai school for San Francisco Bay Area youth, as well as Berkeley's Thai Cultural Center.

In 2001, it marked 25 years of being a temple by completing renovations to its Victorian -era building to adapt the architecture to temple style.

In February 2009, a group of neighbors sought to shut down the Sunday public brunch, citing litter and traffic. The Zoning Adjustments Board of Berkeley voted 8 to 1 to keep the Sunday brunch, and the board chair "praised the temple for being a positive influence" in the neighborhood. The brunch runs on donations; visitors pay for tokens and exchange them for dishes.

The Thai-born Ajahn Manat is the current abbot of Wat Mongkolratanaram.

In 1997 the Wat was home to the East Bay chapter of the Cypherpunks.

See also
 Abhayagiri Buddhist Monastery, Redwood Valley, California
 San Fran Dhammaram Temple, San Francisco
 Vajiradhammapadip Temple, Centereach and Mount Vernon in New York
 Wat Boston Buddha Vararam, Bedford, Massachusetts
 Wat Buddhananachat of Austin, Del Valle, Texas
 Wat Buddhasamakeevanaram, Bossier City, Louisiana
 Wat Buddhanusorn, Fremont, California
 Wat Carolina Buddhajakra Vanaram, Bolivia, North Carolina
 Wat Florida Dhammaram, Kissimmee, Florida
 Wat Mettāvarānaṁ, Valley Center, California
 Wat Mongkolratanaram, Tampa, Florida
 Wat Nawamintararachutis, Raynham, Massachusetts
 Wat Pasantidhamma, Carrollton, Virginia
Buddhism in the United States

References

External links
 Yelp page for Wat Mongkolratanaram

Thai-American culture in California
Thai Theravada Buddhist temples and monasteries
Overseas Thai Buddhist temples
Culture of Berkeley, California
Food and drink in the San Francisco Bay Area
Buddhism in the San Francisco Bay Area
Buddhist temples in Berkeley